Xinjiang People's Broadcasting Station (XJBS) was a radio station broadcasting to the Xinjiang province area. It was operated by the Xinjiang Networking Transmission Limited in Mandarin, Uyghur, Kazakh, Kyrgyz and Mongolian languages. Founded as Dihua People's Broadcasting Station in 1949 it was renamed after Xinjiang in 1951. In 2018 it merged with Xinjiang Television (XJTV) forming the Xinjiang Radio and TV Station.

List of programmes

See also
 Tianshannet

External links
 Official website:
 
 , Arabic and Latin script
 , Arabic, Latin, Cyrillic
 , Arabic, Cyrillic
 Mongolian (Mongolian script in Menksoft encoding)
 Directory of FM radio stations in Xinjiang

Chinese-language radio stations
Mandarin-language radio stations
Mass media in Ürümqi
Radio stations in China
Radio stations established in 1949
1949 establishments in China